Sidney McCall (March 8, 1865January 11, 1954), born Mary McNeill, later Mary McNeil Fenollosa, was an American novelist and poet. Several of her novels were adapted into films.

Biography
McCall was born Mary McNeill (later dropping one of the l's) in Wilcox County, Alabama, to William Stoddard McNeill, a Confederate Army lieutenant from Mobile, Alabama, and Laura Sibley. McCall was the oldest of five children. 

At the age of 18 she married Ludolph Chester who died two years later. She later married Ledyard Scott in Tokyo. However, the marriage was not a happy one and she divorced Scott and returned to the United States in 1892. In 1895 she married Ernest Fenollosa, an American art historian of Japanese art, professor of philosophy and political economy.

Selected works
 Out of the Nest: A Flight of Verses (1899) poetry, under her own name
 Truth Dexter (1901) novel, as Sidney McCall
 Hiroshige, the Artist of Mist, Snow and Rain (1901) essay, under her own name
 The Breath of the Gods : A Japanese Romance of To-day (1905), as Sidney McCall
 The Dragon Painter (1906) under her own name
 Red Horse Hill (1909) novel, as Sidney McCall
 Foreword to Epochs of Chinese and Japanese Art: An Outline History of East Asiatic Design (1912) by Ernest Fenollosa*
 Blossoms from a Japanese Garden: A Book of Child-Verses (1913) poetry, under her own name
 The Strange Woman (1914) novel, as Sidney McCall
 Ariadne of Allan Water (1914) novel, as Sidney McCall
 The Stirrup Latch (1915) novel, as Sidney McCall
 Sunshine Beggars (1918) novel, as Sidney McCall
 Christopher Laird (1919) novel, as Sidney McCall

Mary Fenollosa was also responsible for the posthumous completion, checking and publication of her late husband's work Epochs of Chinese and Japanese Art.

Films
The Breath of the Gods is based on her novel of the same name. The Eternal Mother, a lost 1917 silent film, is based on her Red Horse Hill. The Dragon Painter (1919) is based on her novel The Dragon Painter.

References

Further reading
 Mary McNeil Fenollosa, Encyclopaedia of Alabama
 Delaney, Caldwell. "Mary McNeil Fenollosa, An Alabama Woman of Letters." Alabama Review 16.3 (1965): 163–173.

1865 births
1954 deaths
19th-century American novelists
20th-century American novelists
American women novelists
People from Wilcox County, Alabama
Novelists from Alabama
American women poets
Poets from Alabama
19th-century American women
20th-century American women
People born in the Confederate States